Eutonina is a genus of cnidarians belonging to the family Eirenidae.

The species of this genus are found in Europe and Northern America.

Species:

Eutonina indicans 
Eutonina scintillans

References

Eirenidae
Hydrozoan genera